Hypatima cryptopluta is a moth in the family Gelechiidae. It was described by Alexey Diakonoff in 1954. It is found in New Guinea.

References

Hypatima
Moths described in 1954